The Intracoastal Waterway (ICW) is a  inland waterway along the Atlantic and Gulf of Mexico coasts of the United States, running from Massachusetts southward along the Atlantic Seaboard and around the southern tip of Florida, then following the Gulf Coast to Brownsville, Texas. Some sections of the waterway consist of natural inlets, saltwater rivers, bays, and sounds, while others are artificial canals. It provides a navigable route along its length without many of the hazards of travel on the open sea.

Context and early history
Since the coastline represented the national border, and commerce of the time was chiefly by water, the fledgling United States government established a degree of national control over it. Inland transportation to supply the coasting trade at the time was less known and virtually undeveloped, but when new lands and their favorable river systems were added with the Northwest Territory in 1787, the Northwest Ordinance established a radically new and free national policy for their development and transportation use. 

Over time, internal improvements of natural coastal and inland waterways would develop into the Great Loop, which allows for waterborne circumnavigation of the eastern continental United States, using minimal ocean travel, with the Intracoastal Waterway providing its eastern end. In 1808, the first federal government report on existing, possible, and likely avenues of transportation improvement was presented; it included much of the distance where the ICW now traverses the Atlantic coast. At the request of the Senate, Treasury Secretary Albert Gallatin presented an overall plan for future transportation developments of national importance and scope. Along with inland east–west improvements, Gallatin's north–south improvements included the following:

While Gallatin discussed the details of engineering, construction, and costs, including the national benefits to accrue from lowered transportation costs between domestic and international markets, his full $20 million, 10-year plan was never approved. That is not to say his plan was never implemented, however, for with experience in the War of 1812 shortly thereafter and the attendant British blockade, the continued need for such facility was soon highlighted. Since Gallatin had based his proposals on the known advantageous natural geographic features of the country, many of his proposals became the locations of navigation improvements that were surveyed, authorized, and constructed starting with the 1824 General Survey Act and the first of many pieces of rivers and harbors legislation, as well by individual state-built improvements.

Since these 1824 acts, the United States Army Corps of Engineers (USACE) has responsibility for navigation waterway improvements and maintenance. All four proposed sections of Gallatin's intracoastal plan were eventually built; the Delaware and Raritan Canal was later abandoned for a better alternative, but the Cape Cod Canal remains in operation, and the Delaware and the Dismal Swamp portions still form part of the larger present-day Intracoastal Waterway.

19th-century growth
In 1826, Congress authorized the first survey for an inland canal between the Atlantic Ocean and Gulf of Mexico. After the Civil War, government funding shifted from waterways to railroads; still, coastal improvements authorized for development included the Houston Ship Channel and the Delaware River in 1872. The following year, the Senate's Select Committee on Transportation Routes to the Seaboard looked at the need for more haulage capacity to move freight to the coasts. But their "Report of Windom Select Committee" their plans and recommendations "received less attention than was anticipated, of course by reason of the rapid growth of interest in railways".

In the River and Harbors Appropriations Acts of 1882 and 1884, Congress signaled its intent to improve waterways to benefit the nation by promoting competition among transportation modes. The 1882 act was the first act of Congress to combine appropriations for development of the nation's waterways with a reaffirmation of the policy of freedom from tolls and other user charges, first stated in 1787; it was passed over President Chester Arthur's veto, who considered it a waste of the federal government's growing budget surplus. In 1887, the Interstate Commerce Act established federal regulation of railroads; Congress continued to promote freedom from tolls or special taxes on waterways. In 1890, Congress passed the Sherman Antitrust Act, the first federal statute to limit cartels and monopolies, but the federal government used it minimally until Theodore Roosevelt's presidency more than 10 years later.

Continued insufficient capacity of railroad transportation became apparent following the harvest of 1906.

20th-century developments
The invention of the diesel engine in 1892 eventually led to the conversion of fuels for transportation from coal and steam to diesel and the internal combustion engine. The Rivers and Harbors Act of 1909 set national policy for an intracoastal waterway from Boston to the Rio Grande, and the Rivers and Harbors Act of 1910 authorized a  channel on the Gulf Intracoastal Waterway between the Apalachicola River and St. Andrews Bay, Florida (completed in 1936), as well as a study of the most efficient means to move cargo. Between 1910 and 1914, navigation channels were deepened, and the screw propeller proved efficient for improved steering and flanking qualities. The Panama Canal Act was passed in 1911, which proved key to the revival of waterway transportation in the United States, because the opening of Panama Canal in 1914 allowed coastal shipping to extend to the U.S. West Coast for the first time. The law also prohibited railroads from owning, controlling, or operating a water carrier through the canal and led to succeeding legislation that eliminated monopoly of transportation modes by railroads. The country's World War I experience demonstrated the need for bulk cargo transportation, with Congress establishing the federal barge lines and spurring development of cheaper ways to transport farm commodities, including the first use of standardized freight barges.

In 1924, Congress incorporated the Inland Waterways Corporation, generally regarded as the beginning of modern water carrier operations, and in 1925 it authorized construction of the Louisiana and Texas Intracoastal Waterway, as well as surveys east of New Orleans to Apalachicola Bay; this was the first legislation to treat the ICW as a continuous whole.  The River and Harbor Act of 1927 authorized the portion of the Atlantic Intracoastal Waterway, using the route planned out by the Jacksonville District of the Corps of Engineers. During World War II, the need for efficient transportation of bulk materials within the continental United States was well demonstrated after German submarines sank numerous merchant ships off the East Coast. By 1942, the  ICW channel was completed between New Orleans and Corpus Christi.

Consequently, for larger ships, shoaling or shallow waters are encountered along several sections of the waterway, with these having  or  minimum depths from earlier improvements. While no tolls are charged for waterway usage, commercial users have been charged a fuel tax since 1978, which is used to maintain and improve facilities. That year, the Inland Waterways Revenue Act imposed a barge fuel tax; originally set at 4 cents per gallon in 1980, it was gradually raised to 10 cents per gallon by 1986. To hold these funds, the act also created the Inland Waterways Trust Fund under the U.S. Treasury, which are used to cover half the cost of new construction and major rehabilitation of the inland waterways infrastructure (33 U.S.C. ch.32). The Water Resources Development Act of 1986 was a wide-ranging bill regarding all water resources utilization nationally. Concerning transportation on waterways, this law established the Inland Waterways Users Board to make recommendations regarding construction and rehabilitation priorities and spending levels for the inland waterways, and also gradually increased the incremental fuel tax to 20 cents per gallon by 1995.

Current route

The Intracoastal Waterway runs for most of the length of the Eastern Seaboard. The waterway consists of three non-contiguous segments: from Brownsville, Texas, east to Carrabelle, Florida; from Tarpon Springs, Florida, south to Fort Myers, Florida; and from Key West, Florida, north to Portsmouth, Virginia (milepost 0.0). The first and second sections are collectively referred to as the Gulf Intracoastal Waterway, and the third is referred to as the Atlantic Intracoastal Waterway (AIWW). The first and second sections were intended to be connected via a dredged waterway from Tarpon Springs to St. Marks, Florida (which is near Carrabelle), and the second and third sections were intended to be connected via the Cross Florida Barge Canal across northern Florida. These projects were never completed because of environmental concerns. Additional canals and bays extend a navigable waterway north of Portsmouth. Its unofficial northern terminus is the Manasquan River in New Jersey, where it connects with the Atlantic Ocean at the Manasquan Inlet. North of that is its official terminus point, the Annisquam River, a U.S. Army Corps maintained channel 26 miles (42 km) northeast of Boston, Massachusetts, connecting Annisquam and Gloucester, Massachusetts.

The Intracoastal Waterway has a good deal of commercial activity: barges haul petroleum, petroleum products, foodstuffs, building materials, and manufactured goods. It is also used extensively by recreational boaters. On the east coast, some of the traffic in fall and spring is by snowbirds who regularly move south in winter and north in summer. The waterway is also used when the ocean is too rough for travel. Numerous inlets connect the Atlantic and the Gulf of Mexico with the Intracoastal Waterway. The Intracoastal Waterway connects to several navigable rivers where shipping traffic can travel to inland ports, including the Mississippi, Alabama, Savannah, James, Delaware, Hudson, and Connecticut rivers. The St. Lawrence Seaway and Great Lakes can be accessed via connections with the Hudson River and Erie Canal.

Natural bodies of water
The following natural bodies of water are included in or connect with the Intracoastal Waterway system: 

 Albemarle Sound
 Apalachicola Bay
St. Andrews Bay
Aransas Bay
Barnegat Bay
Biscayne Bay
Boca Ciega Bay
 Bogue Sound
 Bon Secour Bay
 Buzzards Bay
 Cape Cod Bay
 Cape Fear River
 Casco Bay
 Charleston Harbor
 Charlotte Harbor
 Chesapeake Bay
 Choctawhatchee Bay
 Connecticut River
 Corpus Christi Bay
 Delaware Bay
 East River
 Elizabeth River
 Galveston Bay
 Halifax River
 Hampton Roads
 Hudson River
 Indian River Lagoon
 Laguna Madre
 Lake Cocodrie
 Lake Worth Lagoon
 Little River
 Long Island Sound
 Mobile Bay
 Matagorda Bay
 Mississippi Sound
 Narragansett Bay
 Pamlico Sound
 Pensacola Bay
 Perdido Bay
 Sabine Lake
 San Antonio Bay
 Sarasota Bay
 Shallotte River
 Waccamaw River
 Winyah Bay

East Coast canals

Major freight canals
Cape Cod Canal
Chesapeake and Delaware Canal

Other canals

Albemarle and Chesapeake Canal
Alligator-Pungo Canal
Assawoman Canal
Dismal Swamp Canal
Cape May Canal
Delaware and Raritan Canal – no longer operational or part of the Intracoastal Waterway
Okeechobee Waterway
Point Pleasant Canal
Lewes and Rehoboth Canal

See also
Inland waterways of the United States
Waterways forming and crossings of the Atlantic Intracoastal Waterway
Waterways forming and crossings of the Gulf Intracoastal Waterway

References

External links

U.S. Army Corps of Engineers – Atlantic Intracoastal Waterway information site
History of the Gulf Intracoastal Waterway
Atlantic Intracoastal Waterway Association
Gulf Intracoastal Canal Association
Elizabeth City Area Convention & Visitors Bureau
Gulf Intracoastal Waterway at Handbook of Texas
U.S. Army Corps of Engineers – History of the Waterways of the Atlantic Coast of the United States
TV.com listing for Modern Marvels episode
Intracoastal Waterway, Encyclopædia Britannica

 
Waterways in the United States
East Coast of the United States
Gulf Coast of the United States
Gulf of Mexico
Historic American Engineering Record in Texas
Sea lanes
Canals opened in 1936
Bodies of water of New Jersey
Bodies of water of Delaware
Bodies of water of Maryland
Bodies of water of Virginia
Bodies of water of North Carolina
Bodies of water of South Carolina
Bodies of water of Georgia (U.S. state)
Bodies of water of Florida
Bodies of water of Alabama
Bodies of water of Mississippi
Bodies of water of Louisiana
Bodies of water of Texas
Bodies of water of Massachusetts
Bodies of water of New York (state)
Bodies of water of Connecticut
Water transportation in the United States
Navarre, Florida
Geography of Savannah, Georgia
Biloxi, Mississippi